The Philippines participated at the 13th Southeast Asian Games held in Bangkok, Thailand from 8 to 17 December 1985.

SEA Games performance

Medalists

Gold

Silver

Bronze

Multiple

Medal summary

By sports

References

Official Site

Nations at the 1985 Southeast Asian Games
Philippines at the Southeast Asian Games